Charalambos "Pambos" Papadopoulos (born 26 May 1947), better known as Pamboullis Papadopoulos, is a Cypriot former footballer who played as a midfielder and made 25 appearances for the Cyprus national team.

Career
Papadopoulos made his debut for Cyprus on 20 March 1965 in a friendly match against Lebanon, which finished as a 2–0 win. He went on to make 25 appearances, scoring 2 goals, before making his last appearance on 9 December 1979 in a UEFA Euro 1980 qualifying match against Spain, which finished as a 1–3 loss.

Career statistics

International

International goals

References

External links
 Pampos Papadopoulos at NASL
 
 
 
 
 
 Pamboullis Papadopoulos at 11v11.com

1947 births
Living people
Cypriot footballers
Cypriot expatriate footballers
Cypriot expatriate sportspeople in Greece
Expatriate footballers in Greece
Expatriate soccer players in Canada
Cyprus international footballers
Association football midfielders
AEL Limassol players
Olympiacos F.C. players
OFI Crete F.C. players
Toronto Blizzard (1971–1984) players
Cypriot First Division players
Super League Greece players
North American Soccer League (1968–1984) players
Cypriot expatriate sportspeople in Canada